Jeong Nam-gyun (born 23 October 1978) is a South Korean long-distance runner. He competed in the men's marathon at the 2000 Summer Olympics.

References

1978 births
Living people
Athletes (track and field) at the 2000 Summer Olympics
South Korean male long-distance runners
South Korean male marathon runners
Olympic athletes of South Korea
Place of birth missing (living people)
20th-century South Korean people